Shannon, MacShannon, and O'Shannon are Anglicised Irish and Scottish surnames that derive from the Gaelic word seanachaidh, which means "skilled storyteller". Seanachaidh is descended from the Old Irish word senchaid.

Other forms of the name are O'Shawnessey or O'Shannahan.

Several old Gaelic names of Scottish and Irish people alike were Anglicised as Shannon, despite being unrelated.

The 1990 United States Census found that Shannon was a very common surname (#679 out of 88,799) in the United States.

People with the surname Shannon

Academics
 Frederick A. Shannon (1921–1965), American herpetologist
 Richard Shannon (historian), British historian

Artists
 David Shannon (born 1960), American author
 Del Shannon (1934–1990), American rock and roll musician
 Frank Shannon, (1874–1959), Irish-American actor and writer
 James Jebusa Shannon (1862–1923), Anglo-American painter
Joe Shannon (born 1933), Puerto Rican artist, art critic, curator, and art professor
 John Shannon (musician) (born 1980), American modern folk guitarist, vocalist, and composer
 Johnny Shannon (born 1932), English actor
 Julia Shannon, American daguerreotypist
 Mem Shannon (born 1959), American blues singer-guitarist
 Michael Shannon, American actor
 Molly Shannon (born 1964), American actor 
 Preston Shannon (1947–2018), American blues guitarist, singer and songwriter
 Richard Shannon (American writer) (born 1954), American writer
Robert T. Shannon (1895–1950), American screenwriter
 Sharon Shannon (born 1968), Irish musician
 T. Sean Shannon (fl. 2000s), American performer and writer
 Terry Shannon (1952–2005), American engineer and writer
 Tommy Shannon (born 1946), American bassist

Journalists
 Bob Shannon (Radio) (born 1942), Canadian journalist
 Bob Shannon (WCBS-FM) (born 1948), American journalist
 Mark Shannon (born c. 1950), American journalist
 Paul Shannon (1909–1990), American journalist
 Scott Shannon (fl. c. late 20th century), American journalist
 William V. Shannon (1927–1988), American journalist

Military personnel
 Dave Shannon (1922–1993), Australian airman
 John W. Shannon (born 1933), United States Under Secretary of the Army

Politicians
 David Shannon (1822–1875), South Australian politician
 George Shannon (explorer) (1785–1836), also U.S. Senator
 Howard Shannon (1892–1976), Australian politician
 James Shannon, (1840–1891), South Australian politician
 James Michael Shannon (born 1952), American politician
 John Wallace Shannon (1862–1926), South Australian politician
 Nate Shannon, American politician
 Peter Shannon (born 1949), Australian diplomat
 Richard C. Shannon (1839–1920), US Representative from New York
 Steve Shannon (born 1971), American politician
 Thomas A. Shannon, Jr. (born c. 1960), American diplomat

Scientists
 Claude Shannon (1916–2001), American mathematician, electrical engineer and cryptographer known as "the father of information theory"
 Frederick A. Shannon (1921–1965), American biologist
 Raymond Corbett Shannon (1894–1945), American entomologist
 Robert D. Shannon (born 1935), American chemist.

Sportsmen
 Darrin Shannon (born 1969), Canadian hockey player
 Darryl Shannon (born 1968), Canadian hockey player
 Frank Shannon (baseball) (1873–1934), American baseball player
 Les Shannon (1926–2007), English football player and manager
 Mike Shannon (born 1939), American baseball player and journalist
 Rab Shannon (born 1966), Scottish football player
 Randy Shannon (born 1966), American football coach
 Ryan Shannon (born 1983), American Hockey Player - Stanley Cup winner 2007

Others
 Abe Shannon (1869–1945), South Australian pastoralist
 Ricard Shannon (1920–1989), American film and television actor

See also
Irish name
Scottish surnames
Shannon (given name)
The Shannons
Shannon family
The Shannons of Broadway

References

Anglicised Irish-language surnames